Pyrenomonas is a genus of cryptomonad.

Pyrenomonas salina, the type species, was characterized in 1984 but has since been renamed to Rhodomonas salina. Therefore, making the genus Pyrenomonas a synonym of Rhodomonas.

References

Cryptomonad genera